Yarn is one of the main JavaScript package managers, developed in 2016 by Meta (formerly Facebook) for the Node.js JavaScript runtime environment. An alternative to the npm package manager, Yarn was created as a collaboration of Facebook, Exponent (now Expo.dev), Google, and Tilde (the company behind Ember.js) to solve consistency, security, and performance problems with large codebases.

Functionality 
Users can write their own plugins for Yarn.

Constraints 
Yarn constraints allow users to enforce rules for their dependencies or manifest fields across scoped workspaces.

Offline cache 
Downloaded packages are cached and stored as a single file.

Plug'n'Play 
Plug'n'Play allows users to run Node projects without node_modules folder, defining the way or location to resolve dependencies package files with the Plug-n-Play-control file. This feature is aimed to fix an unwell structured node_modules architecture and resulting in a faster Node.js application start-up time.

Plugins 
Plugins can add new resolvers, fetchers, linkers, commands, and can also register to some events or be integrated with each other, most features of Yarn are implemented through plugins, including yarn add and yarn install, which are also preinstalled plugins.

Protocols 
Users can define which protocol will be used to resolve certain packages, for example, the git protocol is used for downloading a public package from a Git repository, and the patch protocol is used for creating a patched copy of the original package.

Release Workflow 
Release Workflow automatically upgrades relative packages among monorepos workspaces when root packages are upgraded.

Workspaces 
Workspaces allow multiple projects to work together in the same repository and automatically apply changes to other relatives when source code is modified, allowing installation of multiple packages in a single pass by running the installation command only once.

Zero-Installs 
Zero-Installs solve the needs of installation of packages when packages is required to install when the codes is just fresh fetched to local.

Comparison to npm 
 Yarn can install packages from local cache.
 Yarn binds versions of the package strongly.
 Yarn uses checksum for ensuring data integrity, while npm uses SHA-512 to check data integrity of the packages downloaded.
 Yarn installs packages in parallel, while npm installs one package at a time.

Syntax 
To install yarn:
 npm install -g yarn

To install a package with yarn:
 yarn add package-name --dev

NB: in the first versions, it was:
 yarn install package-name --save-dev

See also 
 npm (software)
 Node.js

References 

JavaScript programming tools
Package management systems